These are lists of church buildings in Indonesia, based on:
 Completion year of the building
 Region

Around 10% of Indonesia's total population are Christians, and there are approximately 61,000 churches across Indonesia. This list strictly only includes notable church buildings and their historic significance in Indonesian history.

History

In Indonesia, church buildings in the first stage of their creation were simple, shed-like structures, built from bamboo or wood. Once sizable congregations had been established, more permanent buildings were erected, which seated hundreds or even over a thousand.

Precolonial era
There is evidence of the presence of Christian communities (the ancient Church of the East) in north Sumatra as early as the 7th century.

Portuguese arrival in Indonesia
The Portuguese were the first Europeans to arrive in Indonesia. They sought to dominate the sources of valuable spices and to extend their Roman Catholic missionary efforts. Francis Xavier was the most well-known Portuguese missionary in the archipelago, the mission began in 1534 when some chiefs from Morotai came to Ternate asking to be baptised. He later returned to Moluccas and spent his time at Halmahera, Ternate and Amboina in 1546–1547, baptizing several thousand locals.

Dutch documents state that nearly all inhabitants of Ambon were Catholics, introduced by the Portuguese Jesuits, mostly arrived from Goa. Ambon had four fine church buildings and a small hospital, La Misericordia. The Jesuit Church of St. James was from mid-1605 used for Protestant services. In 1630 it was replaced by a stone building called St. Paul's Church.

Dutch East India company in Indonesia

Catholicism in Indonesia came into a dark age when the Protestant-Dutch VOC defeated the Portuguese and took over their possession at Mollucas in 1605 and Solor in 1613. Dutch East India Company  or Vereniging Oost Indie Compagnie (VOC) suppressed the Catholic religion within their conquered territories and banned any Catholic missionary activities. Many Catholics were forcibly converted to Protestantism and Catholic churches were changed for Protestant purposes. As a result of their successful campaign in the East Indies and strong sentiment against the Catholics, many of the earliest surviving well-documented church buildings in the Indonesian archipelago are Protestant churches; most of them are concentrated along the north coast of Java and the islands of Moluccas.

Enslaved Catholics are also encouraged to adapt Protestantism and Dutch sounding names. This happened to the Mardijker people (who were a Portuguese speaking creole group) in Batavia and Depok. Catholicism didn't have any particular rights in Indonesia until 1808 under governor general Daendels, during the French occupation of the Netherlands.

In Batavia, few of the earliest Protestant church structures in Indonesia are well documented. The first church building in the city was a provisional church, erected in 1625 together with the earlier city hall. In 1632 the foundation for a proper church was laid. This was followed by the first stone to be laid in 1640 and the building, known as Oude Hollandse Kerk ("Old Holland Church"), was finished in 1643. The Old Holland Church was later expanded and renamed "Nieuw Hollandse kerk" ("New Holland Church") in 1736. The new church was shaped octagonally according to Calvinism's focus on the sermon and had a domed roof. The church was toppled by an earthquake in 1808, and the remains were completely demolished by Governor General Daendels to obtain building materials for a new government center in Weltevreden. The base of the church can be seen in the Wayang Museum.

In 1644, Governor General Antonio van Diemen built a chapel in Batavia Castle at his own expense. Already in 1633, a simple wooden church with straw roof had been built for services in Malay. The Portuguese Binnenkerk (Portuguese church inside the city walls) was built between 1669 and 1672, initially for Malay services, but also to meet the needs of the Portuguese-speaking Christians. Another Portuguese-language church was built outside the city walls in 1695, the Portuguese Buitenkerk, now Gereja Sion, the oldest surviving church building in Indonesia.

On 18 May 1696, a former VOC officer Cornelis Chastelein bought the land with an area of 12.44 km2, 6.2% the area of today's Depok. There he established the first of its kind in Java, a Protestant congregation consisting of native Indonesians which was named De Eerste Protestante Organisatie van Christenen (DEPOC). , dating back to 1714, can still be seen standing. Its church bell was made in 1675.

Dutch East Indies and post-independent Indonesia
In 1799 VOC officially went bankrupt and was dissolved in 1800 with its possessions taken over by the Dutch crown as the Dutch East Indies. Later in 1817, the Dutch government founded the Protestantsche Kerk in Nederlandsch-Indie ("Indische Kerk") as a union of Reformed, Lutheran, Baptists, Arminian and Mennonite denominations. During the 18th to 19th century the new architectural trends were Neoclassical architecture. Examples of these were Batavia's Immanuel Church, Semarang's Blenduk Church and GKJ Mojowarno.

Missionary activities increased with territorial gain. Works were mostly aimed to convert native Animist population such as the Bataks, Torajans, Minahasans, Papuans and Dayaks  (who today form the Christian majority of both Catholic and Protestant). These missionaries established many mission churches, schools and institutions across the country.

In the late 19th century until the end of the Dutch rule in 1942, Indonesia followed the Neogothic architecture that was common in Europe at that time. The best example of neogothic architecture built in Indonesia is Jakarta Cathedral. Art Deco and its various Dutch architectural branches, such as the Amsterdam School or Nieuwe Zakelijkheid, became the new fashion of the Indies during this period. A few examples of this architectural influence on churches are Bandung's Bethel church, Jakarta's St Joseph's Church, Semarang's Cathedral and Zion Church of Tomohon.

Apart from Art Deco as a form of modernism, there were also attempts by many Dutch architect to modernize the indigenous architecture by creating a synthesized form of architecture which combined Western architecture with indigenous Indonesian elements. In 1936, Henri Maclaine Pont designed the Pohsarang Church in Kediri, which incorporated Hindu-Buddhist elements into a Western building. This legacy lived on even after the independence of Indonesia, and was applied to various public buildings, including churches in the country. In 1972, native Balinese I Wayan Mastra became head of the Balinese Protestant church, and began a process of Balinization. When Blimbingsari church, a basic stone and wood building, was destroyed by earthquake in 1976, it was rebuilt in more Balinese pendopo style, with a garden with running water, traditional Balinese entrance and a semi-open aspect. A similar trend occurred in other islands, such as Batak Karo architecture of St. Francis Asisi's Church in Berastagi, and the Ganjuran Church, which used Javanese Joglo architecture.

Many Indonesian Protestants tend to congregate based more on ethnicity than liturgical differences. As a result, after the independence of Indonesia the Protestant Church of Indonesia was broke down into various denominations based on ethnicity, resulting in a relatively higher number of Protestant denomination per capita in the country. This was also due to the cultural and languages preferences among each of the different ethnic groups in Indonesia.

Today
Although Protestantism and Catholicism are two of the six recognized religions in Indonesia, prosecution against Christians is common in the country. Many of the conflicts are linked to the extremist groups in the country. In 1999, the   Maluku sectarian conflict occurred, a religion and ethnicity based violence which claimed many lives of both Muslims and Christians. During this event the historic Immanuel Church in Hila was destroyed; however, it was later rebuilt with the help of the Muslim community. Another church in Ambon was set on fire in 2011, forcing the people inside to flee.

In December 2011, GKI Taman Yasmin had been sealed. Local authorities refused to lift a ban on the activities of the church, despite an order from the Supreme Court of Indonesia. Local authorities persecuted the Christian church for four years. In 2013 another church in Bekasi was forced to shut down due to the lack of an official permit for building the premise. While the state has ordered religious tolerance, it has not enforced these orders to protect the religious minority in the country. Three churches were burned and damaged in Temanggung, Central Java in 2011, as Christians were accused of distributing pamphlets that were "insulting" Islam.

In Aceh where Sharia law is applied, it is against Governor Regulation No. 25/2007 about Guidelines for the Construction of Houses of Worship. In the regulations, the construction of a church in Aceh requires 150 congregations to apply for a church construction permit. Indonesia is also notorious for its church bombing by extremists on Christmas Eve of 2000.

Oldest churches in Indonesia
Below is a list of oldest church buildings in Indonesia based on year of completion. To be listed here, the completion of the church building needs to be at least before the 20th century. Churches with alterations which completely changed their appearance after the 20th century should not be placed in this table.

Largest churches in Indonesia
Below is a list of the largest church buildings in Indonesia, based on capacity. To be listed here, the building's capacity must exceed 5,000 and the building must be used exclusively for church-related activities.

By region

Java
DKI Jakarta
 Gereja Lahai Roi, Cijantung (1930)
 All Saints Anglican Church (1819). 
 Simultan Church, Menteng Pulo (1950)
 GKI Kwitang Church (established 1877, current form 1924, formerly known as "Gereformeerd Kwitang")
 GPIB Immanuel Church (1839, formerly known as "Willemskerk") 
 GPIB Pniel Church (1915, formerly known as "Haantjeskerk")
 GPIB Koinonia Church (1916, formerly known as "Bethelkerk")
 GPIB Paulus Church (1936, formerly known as "Nassaukerk")
 GPIB Sion Church (1695, formerly known as "Portugeesche Kerk")
 Jakarta Cathedral (1901, official name: The Church of Our Lady Assumption)
 Messiah Cathedral
 St. Anthony of Padua's Church (1895)
 St. Joseph's Church, Matraman (1909)
 St. Theresia's Church (1934)
 GPIB Tugu Church (1748)

West Java
 Bandung Cathedral, Bandung (1922, official name: St. Peter's Cathedral)
 Blessed Virgin Mary, Mother of Seven Sorrows Church, Pandu, Bandung (1935, locally known as "Gereja Pandu")
 GKI Taman Cibunut Church, Bandung (1916)
 GPIB Bethel Church, Bandung (1924)
 GPIB Maranatha Church, Bandung (1927)
 St. Albanus Free Catholic Church, Bandung (1920)
 Bogor Cathedral, Bogor (1896, official name: St. Mary the virgin Cathedral)
 GPIB Zebaoth Church, Bogor (1920)
 Pasundan Christian Church (GKP), Palalangon, Cianjur Regency (1902)
 St. Ignatius Church, Cimahi (1906–1908)
 Pasundan Christian Church (GKP), Cirebon (around 1788, became a church in 1864)
 St. Joseph's Church, Cirebon (1880)
 , Depok (1998, contain a bell dating back to 1675) (established in 1714, destroyed by earthquake in 1834 and rebuilt in 1854, later expanded in 1980 and 1998 due to overcapacity)
 St. Mary the Immaculate Church, Garut (1917)
 GKI Indramayu Church, Indramayu (1912)
 Trial of Christ's Church, Sukabumi (1911)
 Sacred Heart of Jesus Parish Church, Tasikmalaya (established 1931, current structure 1955)

Central Java
 St. Willibrordus's Church, Cepu, Cepu district, Blora Regency (1930)
 Javanese Gospel Church (GITJ), Donorojo, Jepara Regency (1935)
 GPIB Beth-el Church, Magelang (1817)
 GPIB Beth-el Kebon Polo Church, Magelang (1927)
 Javanese Christian Church (GKJ), Magelang (1921)
 St. Joseph the worker's Church, Mertoyudan, Magelang (1911)
 St. Ignatius Church, Magelang (established 1899, expanded in 1926 and later damaged by conflict, current form are from 1962)
 GPIB Griya Mulya Church, Purworejo (1879)
 Javanese Christian Church (GKJ), Jenar, Purworejo (1933)
 St. Mary the Virgin Church, Purworejo (1927)
 St. Anthony's Church, Muntilan (established in 1862, current structure 1911)
 GPIB Tamansari Church, Salatiga (1823)
 Javanese Christian Central-Northern Church (GKJTU), Salatiga (1918)
 St. Paul Miki's Church, Salatiga (1928)
 St. Joseph's Church, Ambarawa, Semarang Regency (1924, locally known as "Gereja Jago")
 GPIB Immanuel Church, Semarang (1753, current form 1894)
 GKI Gereformeerd Church, Semarang (1918)
 Holy Rosary Cathedral, Semarang (1927)
 Holy Family Atmodirono Church, Semarang (1940)
 St. Joseph's Church, Semarang (1875)
 GPIB Penabur Church, Surakarta (1980) (The church was built over an older Calvinist church known as Indische Kerk (1832). The older church was destroyed by a flood in 1966)
 Javanese Christian Church Margoyudan (GKJ), Surakarta (1916)
 St. Anthony's Church, Surakarta (1905)
 St. Peter's Church, Surakarta  (1938)

East Java
 St. Joseph's Church, Blitar (1931)
 St. John the Evangelist's Church, Bondowoso (1935–1936)
 Jawi Wetan Christian Church (GKJW), Mojowarno, Jombang Regency (1881)
 , Pohsarang village (1936), Kediri
 GPIB Immanuel Church, Kediri (1904, Known locally as Gereja Merah or "red church")
 Cathedral of Our Lady of Mount Carmel, Malang (1934)
 Sacred Heart of Jesus Church, Malang (1905, tower added in the 1930s, locally known as Gereja Kayutangan)
 GPIB Immanuel Church, Malang (1912)
 Jawi Wetan Christian Church (GKJW), Peniwen, Malang Regency
 St. Cornelius Church, Madiun (established 1899, current form 1937)
 GPIB Immanuel Church, Probolinggo (1862) (Known locally as Gereja Merah or "red church")
 GPIB Pniel Church, Pasuruan (1829) (The church was built on November 15, 1829)
 St. Anthony of Padua's Church, Pasuruan (1932)
 Church of the Birth of Our Lady, Surabaya, Surabaya (1899)
 Christ the King Catholic Church, Ketabang, Surabaya (built in 1933, current form 1957)
 Christ the God Methodist Church, Surabaya (current church are built in 1952, Founded by Chinese Presbyterian movement in 1910 and later transferred to American Methodist Church in 1928)
 Jawi Wetan Christian Church (GKJW), Gubeng, Surabaya (1924)
 GPIB Immanuel Church, Surabaya (1920)
 GPIB Maranatha Church, Surabaya
 GKI Pregolan Bunder Church, Surabaya (1914–1920, formerly known as "Gereformeerd Surabaya")
 Graha Bethany Nginden (1978), is a megachurch which is one of the largest churches in Surabaya, Indonesia and Southeast Asia.
 Sacred Heart Cathedral, Surabaya (1921)
 St. Bonafacius Free Catholic Church, Surabaya (1923)

Ngawi
 St. Joseph Church Ngawi
 Christ King Ngrambe Catholic Church
 Jawi Wetan Ngawi Protestant Church
 Jawi Wetan Dawu Protestant Church
 Bethel Church Indonesia Family of God Ngawi
 GUPPDI Karang Asri
 Ngrambe Tabernacle Bethel Church (GBT)
 Santa Maria Walikukun Catholic Church
 SCPC Ngawi
 SCPC Paron

Special Region of Yogyakarta
 , Yogyakarta (1857)
 Javanese Christian Church Gondokusuman (GKJ), Yogyakarta (1913)
 St. Anthony of Padua's Church, Kotabaru, Yogyakarta (1918)
 St. Aloysius Gonzaga's Church, Mlati (1931) 
 St. Mary of Loudres's Church, Promasan (1940) 
 St. Theresia's Church, Sedayu (1925)
 St. Francis Xavier's Church, Kidul Loji (established in 1871) 
 St. Joseph's Church, Bintaran (1930s)
 Ganjuran Church, Bantul (1920s)

Sumatra
Aceh

 Sacred Heart Church, Banda Aceh (1926)
Riau Islands
 GPIB Bethel Church, Tanjung Pinang, Bintan Island (1836, formerly known as "De Nederlandse Hervormde Kerk te Tandjoengpinang")
 St. Mary the Immaculate Heart Church, Tanjung Pinang, Bintan Island
North Sumatra
 Batak Christian Protestant Church (HKPB), Balige, Toba Samosir Regency (founded 1861, current form 1917)
 Batak Christian Protestant Church (HKPB), Tomok, Toba Samosir Regency
 Batak Christian Protestant Church (HKPB), Parapat
 St. Francis of Assisi's Church, Berastagi (2005). The church was built in traditional Batak Karo architecture.
 GMI Gloria Merak Jingga Church, Medan
 GMI – Jemmaat Gloria Church, Medan
 Karo Batak Protestant Church, Kabanjahe
 Batak Christian Protestant Church (HKPB), Sudirman Road, Medan (1912, formerly known as "Elisabethkerk")
 Christ the King Nusantara Parish Catholic Church, Medan (Formerly known as the Chinese Catholic Church)
 GPIB Immanuel Church, Medan (1921)
 Graha Maria Annai Velangkanni, Medan (2005)
 Indonesian Christian Church (GKI), Percut Road, Medan (Formerly known as "Javaanse Gereformeerde Kerk")
 Indonesian Christian Church of North Sumatra (GKI Sumut), Medan (1904, formerly known as "Gereformeerde Kerk").
 Indonesian Methodist Church (GMI) Hang Tuah, Medan (Formerly known as Methodisten Kerk)
 Medan Cathedral, Medan (founded 1879, current form 1905)
 St. Laurentius Catholic Church, Pematangsiantar

West Sumatra
 St. Peter Claver's Church, Bukittinggi
 St. Agnes Church, Padang (formerly known as "Kloosterkerk")
 St. Fidelis Church, Payakumbuh
 St. Barbara's Church, Sawahlunto (1920s)

Bangka Belitung Islands
 GPIB Maranatha Church, Pangkal Pinang (1927, formerly known as "Kerkeraad der Protestansche Gemeente")
 St. Joseph Cathedral, Pangkal Pinang (1934)

South Sumatra
 GPIB Immanuel Church, Palembang (1948, Known locally as Gereja Ayam or "Cock Church")
 GPIB Siloam Church, Palembang (1933)
 St. Mary the Immaculate Church,  Pagarjati (1932)
 St. Michael Church, Tanjung Sakti (1898)

Lampung
 GPIB Marturia Church, Bandar Lampung (1948)

Borneo
West Kalimantan
 St. Fidelis Church of Sejiram, Kapuas Hulu (1890)
 St. Joseph Cathedral, Pontianak (established 1909, rebuilt in 1950, original building were completely revamped as of 2012)
 St. Francis Asisi Church, Singkawang (Early 20th century)
 GSRI Church, Singkawang
 Various congregations and evangelism posts of West Kalimantan Christian Church (GKKB)

Central Kalimantan
 , Mandomai, Kapuas Regency (founded 1855, current form 1876, renovated in 1928)

South Kalimantan
 , Banjarmasin (1931, official name: Holy Family Cathedral)

Sulawesi
North Sulawesi
 Schwarz Sentrum Church, Langowan (1895)
 Manado Cathedral, Manado (founded 1919, official name: Holiest heart of Mary Cathedral)
 Sentrum Church, Manado (1952)
 Zion Church, Tomohon (1930) (The original wooden church was built at least before 1878, according to the first establishment of the bell tower, which was built in 1878. In 1929, the current church building was built above the original church. The building was inaugurated in 1930. The building is 30x20 meter)
 Sacred Heart of Jesus Church, Tomohon
 Old Church of Watumea, Watumea (1872)
South Sulawesi
 , Makassar (built in 1898 as a neogothic church, later expanded and tower added in the 1940s, official name: Sacred Heart of Jesus Cathedral)
 GPIB Immanuel Church, Makassar (1885)
West Sulawesi
 Toraja Mamasa Church of Mamasa, Mamasa (1929)
 Toraja Church of Rantepao, Rantepao

Bali
Sacred Heart of Jesus Church, Palasari
Pniel Protestant Church, Blimbingsari

Lesser Sunda Islands
 Mater Boni Consili (MBC) Church, Bajawa, Flores
 Christo Regi Cathedral, Ende, Flores
 Sacred heart Church, Wolowaru, Ende, Flores (1937)
 Reihna Rosari Cathedral, Larantuka, Flores
 Christ the King Mbau Muku Church, Ruteng, Manggarai Regency, Flores
 Old Cathedral of Ruteng, Manggarai Regency, Flores (1929–1939)
 Old Church of Sikka, Sikka, Flores (1899)

The Moluccas
Ambon Islands

In Ambon Island, many of the church buildings, including the 18th-century St. Immanuel's Old Church of Hila, were destroyed during the Maluku sectarian conflict. Some of these churches have been restored by the community.
 Ambon Cathedral, Ambon (founded in 1901, official name: St. Francis Xaverius Cathedral)
 , Ambon (1954)
 Baithlehem Church, Hutumuri, Southern Leitimur (1832)
 Joseph Kam's Church
 Old Church of Hatu, West Leihitu
 St. Immanuel's Old Church, Hila (1781, current form 1854)
 Soya Church (founded 1546, current form 1876)

Nusalaut Islands
 Ebenhaezer Church, Sila, Nusa Laut (1719)
 Beth Eden Church, Nusa Laut (1817)

Saparua Islands
 Old Church of Nolloth, Saparua (1860)

Banda Islands
 Old Church of Banda, Banda Neira (established early 1600s, damaged by earthquake and rebuilt in 1852)

Papua

West Papua
 Orange Church, Doom Island (1911)

Papua
 Old church of Asei, Asei Island, Sentani (1928)

See also 
List of oldest church buildings
List of cathedrals in Indonesia
Christianity in Indonesia
Christmas in Indonesia

References

Cited works

External links

Churches in Indonesia
.
church buildings
Indonesia
Roman Catholic churches in Indonesia
Roman Catholic cathedrals in Indonesia